Enoxolone (INN, BAN; also known as glycyrrhetinic acid or glycyrrhetic acid) is a pentacyclic triterpenoid derivative of the beta-amyrin type obtained from the hydrolysis of glycyrrhizic acid, which was obtained from the herb liquorice. It is used in flavoring and it masks the bitter taste of drugs like aloe and quinine. It is effective in the treatment of peptic ulcer and also has expectorant (antitussive) properties.  It has some additional pharmacological properties with possible antiviral, antifungal, antiprotozoal, and antibacterial activities.

Mechanism of action
Glycyrrhetinic acid inhibits the enzymes (15-hydroxyprostaglandin dehydrogenase and delta-13-prostaglandin) that metabolize the prostaglandins PGE-2 and PGF-2α to their respective, inactive 15-keto-13,14-dihydro metabolites. This increases prostaglandins in the digestive system. Prostaglandins inhibit gastric secretion, stimulate pancreatic secretion and mucous secretion in the intestines, and markedly increase intestinal motility. They also cause cell proliferation in the stomach. The effect on gastric acid secretion, and promotion of mucous secretion and cell proliferation shows why licorice has potential in treating peptic ulcers.

Licorice should not be taken during pregnancy, because PGF-2α stimulates activity of the uterus during pregnancy and can cause abortion.

The structure of glycyrrhetinic acid is similar to that of cortisone. Both molecules are flat and similar at positions 3 and 11. This might be the basis for licorice's anti-inflammatory action.

3-β-D-(Monoglucuronyl)-18-β-glycyrrhetinic acid, a metabolite of glycyrrhetinic acid, inhibits the conversion of 'active' cortisol to 'inactive' cortisone in the kidneys. This occurs via inhibition of the enzyme 11-β-hydroxysteroid dehydrogenase. As a result, cortisol levels become high within the collecting duct of the kidney. Cortisol has intrinsic mineralocorticoid properties (that is, it acts like aldosterone and increases sodium reabsorption) that work on ENaC channels in the collecting duct.  Hypertension develops due to this mechanism of sodium retention. People often have high blood pressure with a low renin and low aldosterone blood level. The increased amounts of cortisol binds to the unprotected, nonspecific mineralocorticoid receptors and induce sodium and fluid retention, hypokalaemia, high blood pressure, and inhibition of the renin-angiotensin-aldosterone system. Therefore, licorice should not be given to patients with a known history of hypertension in doses sufficient to inhibit 11-β-hydroxysteroid dehydrogenase.

Derivatives

In glycyrrhetinic acid, the functional group (R) is a hydroxyl group. Research in 2005 demonstrated that with a proper functional group a very effective glycyrrhetinic artificial sweetener can be obtained. When R is an anionic NHCO(CH2)CO2K side chain, the sweetening effect is found to be 1200 times that of sugar (human sensory panel data). A shorter or longer spacer reduces the sweetening effect. One explanation is that the taste bud cell receptor has 1.3 nanometers (13 angstroms) available for docking with the sweetener molecule. In addition, the sweetener molecule requires three proton donor positions, of which two reside at the extremities, to be able to interact efficiently with the receptor cavity.

A synthetic analog, carbenoxolone, was developed in Britain.  Both glycyrrhetinic acid and carbenoxolone have a modulatory effect on neural signaling through gap junction channels.

Acetoxolone, the acetyl derivative of glycyrrhetinic acid, is a drug used in the treatment of peptic ulcer and gastroesophageal reflux disease.

SARS-CoV and COVID-19 therapeutic 
It has an anti-inflammatory effect. Highly effective antiviral, effective against influenza, SARS CoV and SARS CoV-2 (COVID-19) viruses. Excessive consumption lowers potassium levels in the blood, which in turn raises blood pressure as well as lowers blood sugar levels.

See also 
 11α-Hydroxyprogesterone

References

Further reading 
Saponin Glycosides , by Georges-Louis Friedli, URL accessed Sept 2010.

External links 

11β-Hydroxysteroid dehydrogenase inhibitors
Sugar substitutes
Carboxylic acids
Flavors
Triterpenes
Cyclohexanols
Enones
Dermatologic drugs
Pentacyclic compounds